Usmanul Haq Indian politicians member of Samajwadi Party Moradabad Rural (Assembly constituency) 2007 Uttar Pradesh Legislative Assembly election

References

Samajwadi Party politicians from Uttar Pradesh
Living people
Year of birth missing (living people)